Michael "Mick"/"Mike" Smith (born ) is an English former professional rugby league footballer who played in the 1960s and 1970s.

Background
Michael Smith was born in Rossington, Doncaster, West Riding of Yorkshire, England.

Playing career

County honours
Michael Smith won caps for Yorkshire while at Featherstone Rovers; during the 1974–75 season against Cumbria and Other Nationalities.

Challenge Cup Final appearances
Mick Smith played  in Featherstone Rovers' 17-12 victory over Barrow in the 1966–67 Challenge Cup Final during the 1966–67 season at Wembley Stadium, London on Saturday 13 May 1967, in front of a crowd of 76,290, played right-, i.e. number 3, (replaced by interchange/substitute David "Dave" Hartley) in the 33-14 victory over Bradford Northern in the 1972–73 Challenge Cup Final during the 1972–73 season at Wembley Stadium, London on Saturday 12 May 1973, in front of a crowd of 72,395, and played right-, i.e. number 3, in the 9-24 defeat by Warrington in the 1973–74 Challenge Cup Final during the 1973–74 season at Wembley Stadium, London on Saturday 11 May 1974, in front of a crowd of 77,400.

County Cup Final appearances
Mick Smith played  in Featherstone Rovers' 12-25 defeat by Hull Kingston Rovers in the 1966–67 Yorkshire County Cup Final during the 1966–67 season at Headingley Rugby Stadium, Leeds on Saturday 15 October 1966, played left-, i.e. number 4, in the 9-12 defeat by Hull F.C. in the 1969–70 Yorkshire County Cup Final during the 1969–70 season at Headingley Rugby Stadium, Leeds on Saturday 20 September 1969, and played , i.e. number 2, in the 7-23 defeat by Leeds in the 1970–71 Yorkshire County Cup Final during the 1970–71 season at Odsal Stadium, Bradford on Saturday 21 November 1970.

Club career
Mick Smith made his début for Featherstone Rovers on Saturday 31 October 1964, and he played his last match for Featherstone Rovers during the 1976–77 season, he appears to have scored no drop-goals (or field-goals as they are currently known in Australasia), but prior to the 1974–75 season all goals, whether; conversions, penalties, or drop-goals, scored 2-points, consequently prior to this date drop-goals were often not explicitly documented, therefore '0' drop-goals may indicate drop-goals not recorded, rather than no drop-goals scored.

Career records
The Featherstone Rovers most tries in a match record of six tries is jointly held by; Chris Bibb, Brad Dwyer, and Mike Smith, Smith scored six tries against Doncaster on Saturday 13 April 1968.

Testimonial match
Mick Smith's benefit season/testimonial match at Featherstone Rovers took place during the 1974–75 season.

Coaching career
Mick Smith has coached Doncaster Toll Bar Under-16s.

Honoured at Featherstone Rovers
Mick Smith is a Featherstone Rovers Hall of Fame inductee.

References

External links

1947 births
Living people
English rugby league coaches
English rugby league players
Featherstone Rovers players
Huddersfield Giants players
People from Rossington
Place of birth missing (living people)
Rugby league centres
Rugby league five-eighths
Rugby league players from Doncaster
Yorkshire rugby league team players